Rio Verdão (Portuguese for "Big Green river") is a river of Goiás state in central Brazil. It is a tributary of the Rio dos Bois.

See also
List of rivers of Goiás

References

Rivers of Goiás